Debora Sabrina González (born 10 January 1990) is an Argentine basketball player for Dike Basket Napoli and the Argentina women's national basketball team.

She defended Argentina at the 2018 FIBA Women's Basketball World Cup.

References

External links

1990 births
Living people
Argentine expatriate basketball people in Italy
Argentine women's basketball players
People from Lomas de Zamora
Point guards
Sportspeople from Buenos Aires Province